Zeko may refer to:

Zèko, Benin
Zecco Department, Burkina Faso

People with the given name
Nakamura Yoshikoto or Nakamura Zekō (1867–1927), Japanese politician
 (1899–1987), Bulgarian writer who won the Herder Prize in 1970
Zeko Burgess, Bermudian cricketer